Irja Aav (née Irja Pilvet; 12 May 1944 Tallinn – 6 August 1995 Tallinn) was an Estonian actress.

In 1964 she graduated from Estonian Drama Theatre's stage studio. Since 1965 she worked at Estonian Drama Theatre. Besides theatrical roles she played also on several films.

From 1965 until 1974 she was married to Estonian actor Tõnu Aav. The couple had two sons, music producer and conductor Lauri Aav and prop maker Ardi Aav.

Selected filmography
 1970 Kolme katku vahel (role: Epp)
 1972 Verekivi (role: first servant)
 1988 Ma pole turist, ma elan siin (role: dispatcher Pille)
 1991 Vana mees tahab koju (role: ?)
 1992 Armastuse lahinguväljad (role: Bride's mother)

References

Living people
1944 births
1995 deaths
Estonian stage actresses
Estonian theatre directors
Estonian film actresses
Estonian television actresses
Estonian radio actresses
20th-century Estonian actresses
Estonian Academy of Music and Theatre alumni
Actresses from Tallinn